Born to Kill may refer to:

Film
 Born to Kill (1947 film), a film noir directed by Robert Wise
 Born to Kill (1967 film), a Spaghetti Western directed by Antonio Mollica
 Born to Kill (1974 film) or Cockfighter, a film directed by Monte Hellman
 Born to Kill (1996 film), a South Korean action film

Music
 "Born to Kill", a song by Scotch from Evolution (Scotch Album)
 "Born to Kill", a song by The Damned from Damned Damned Damned
 "Born to Kill", a song by Gillan from Double Trouble
 "Born to Kill", a song by the Matthew Good Band from Beautiful Midnight
 "Born to Kill", a song by The Thermals from Desperate Ground
 "Born to Kill", a song by Rick Ross from Port of Miami 2

Television
 "Born to Kill" (CSI: Miami), an episode of the TV series CSI: Miami
 Born to Kill (Bubblegum Crisis), an episode of the anime series Bubblegum Crisis
 Born to Kill?, a factual British TV series about serial killers
 Born to Kill (TV series), a 2017 British drama series

Other uses
 Born to Kill (gang), a 1980s/1990s Vietnamese gang in New York City
 "Born to Kill", a catch-phrase from the 1987 film Full Metal Jacket